Tetracentrum is a genus of fish in the family Ambassidae, the Asiatic glassfishes. They are all native to freshwater in New Guinea.

Species
There are currently three recognized species in this genus:
 Tetracentrum apogonoides W. J. Macleay, 1883 (Four-spined glass perchlet)
 Tetracentrum caudovittatus (Norman, 1935) (Kokoda glass perchlet)
 Tetracentrum honessi (L. P. Schultz, 1945) (Honess' glass perchlet)

References 

 
Ambassidae
Endemic fauna of Papua New Guinea
Taxonomy articles created by Polbot